Abdel Hamid Ahmed (born 3 March 1984) is an Egyptian footballer.

Career
A left back, Ahmed currently plays at the club level for El Dakhleya.

He made his league debut with Al Ahly in a match against Tersana on 29 December 2008.

References

1984 births
Living people
Egyptian footballers
Association football defenders
Al Ahly SC players
Wadi Degla SC players
Egyptian Premier League players